The 2008 Tour of Poland cycling road race took place from 14 to 20 September 2008.

Stages

Stage 1
14 September 2008 — Warsaw – 4 km (TTT)

Stage 2
15 September 2008 — Płock > Olsztyn – 231.2 km

Stage 3
16 September 2008 — Mikołajki > Białystok – 184.8 km

Stage 4
September 17: Bielsk Podlaski > Lublin
The results of Stage 4 were annulled due to a protest on the finishing laps. The riders stopped riding within the wet and technical finishing circuit when they learned that time gap were counted within the last circuit lap. All results, including intermediate sprints during the stage, were annulled.

Stage 5
September 18: Nałęczów > Rzeszów

Stage 6
September 19: Krynica-Zdrój > Zakopane

Stage 7
September 20: Rabka Zdrój > Kraków

Category leadership table

Standings

General classification

King of the Mountains Classification

See also
2008 in road cycling

References

External links

 

Tour de Pologne
Tour de Pologne
Tour de Pologne
September 2008 sports events in Europe